IOD or Iod may refer to:

 Ignition off draw, the drawing of electric current in a vehicle while shut off
 Indian Ocean Dipole
 Institute of Directors
 Interactive Orbit Determination, a data reporting format for satellite observation
 International One Design, a sailboat designed in the 1930s
 Iod (river), a river in Romania, tributary of the Mureș
 Iod, a village in the commune Răstolița, Mureș County, Romania